Hearts and the Highway is a 1915 silent film historical drama directed by Wilfrid North and produced by the Vitagraph Company of America. It is based on a novel of the same title by Cyrus Townsend Brady.

The film is now lost with no archival holdings.

Cast
Lillian Walker - Lady Katherine
Darwin Karr - Sir Harry Richmond
Donald Hall - King James II
L. Rogers Lytton - Lord Jeffries
Charles Kent - Earl of Clanaranald
Charles Eldridge - Master Dunn
Charles Wellesley - General Ramesey
Anders Randolf - Chief Justice of Scotland
Ned Finley - General Feversham
Harry Northrup - Lord Stenwold
William Gilson - Alison McLeod
Rose Tapley - Dame McLeod

References

External links
 Hearts and the Highway at IMDb.com

Promotion material: front,..flip side
still image

1915 films
American silent feature films
Films based on American novels
Vitagraph Studios films
American black-and-white films
Lost drama films
1915 lost films
Lost American films
Films set in the 1680s
Films set in London
Films set in England
1910s historical drama films
American historical drama films
1915 drama films
Films directed by Wilfrid North
1910s American films
Silent American drama films
1910s English-language films